Anastasia Savina (born March 18, 1992) is a Russian chess player. She was awarded the titles International Master and Woman Grandmaster by FIDE.

Career 
Savina qualified for the Women's World Chess Championship 2016 (knock-out). She played for the Russia "B" team at the 39th Chess Olympiad and won a silver medal at chess at the 2013 Summer Universiade. She is an alumna of the Russian State University of Physical Education, Sport, Youth and Tourism, Department of Chess.

References

External links 

Anastasia Savina games at 365Chess.com

Living people
1992 births
Chess International Masters
Chess woman grandmasters
Russian female chess players
Universiade medalists in chess
Universiade silver medalists for Russia
Date of birth missing (living people)
Place of birth missing (living people)
Russian State University of Physical Education, Sport, Youth and Tourism, Department of Chess alumni
Medalists at the 2013 Summer Universiade